The 2000 Copa Apertura Final was played between Universidad de Chile and Santiago Morning at the Estadio Nacional in Santiago, Chile on May 11. Universidad de Chile won the match 2-1 after extra time.

Match details

Copa Chile finals
2000 in Chilean football
Santiago Morning matches
Club Universidad de Chile matches